The Battle of Palm Sunday also known as the Massacre of Palm Sunday was a Scottish clan battle that took place in 1429 in the Scottish Highlands between the Clan Cameron and the confederation of Clan Chattan.

Historical accounts

The battle is mentioned in several accounts such as Walter Bower (c. 1385–1449) in his work Scotichronicon, John Major (1467–1550) in his History of Greater Britain and George Buchanan (1506-1582) in his History of Scotland, Rerum Scoticarum Historia.

Background

The (Mackintosh of) Kinrara MS (manuscript, c.1680) states that just before the battle the Camerons had taken a spreagh of cattle from Strathdearn.

Battle

According to Major, the Clan Cameron and Clan Chattan both having deserted Alexander of Islay, Earl of Ross attached themselves like honest men to the king, but on the Palm Sunday following the Clan Chattan put to death every mother's son of the Clan Cameron. Buchanan stated that many of the Mackintoshes and almost all of the Camerons were slain. The Clan Cameron account states that the Clan Mackintosh who were leaders of the Chattan Confederation attacked the Camerons when they were worshiping in a church and that during the engagement most of the Mackintoshes and almost the whole tribe of Camerons were cut to pieces.

References

Notes

Palm Sunday
Palm Sunday
Palm Sunday
15th-century massacres
Palm Sunday
Attacks on churches in Europe